TSS Colleen Bawn was a twin screw passenger steamship operated by the Lancashire and Yorkshire Railway from 1903 to 1922.

History

She was built by Vickers Limited of Barrow-in-Furness for the  Lancashire and Yorkshire Railway in 1903 and launched on 12 June 1903 by Mrs. Aspinall, wife of John Aspinall, one of the directors of the railway company.

In 1912 the other ex-Drogheda Steam Packet Company paddlers, Iverna and Norah Creina, were also withdrawn from service.

Passenger service between Drogheda and Liverpool was discontinued in 1914, but the Colleen Bawn continued on the route in freight service. She passed into the hands of the London & North Western Railway in 1922 and the London, Midland & Scottish Railway in 1923. The LMS passed the Drogheda-Liverpool route to the British & Irish Steam Packet Company in 1928, and the Colleen Bawn was moved to the freight service between Holyhead and Greenore. She was scrapped in 1931.

References

1903 ships
Ships built in Barrow-in-Furness
Passenger ships of the United Kingdom
Ships of the London and North Western Railway
Ships of the Lancashire and Yorkshire Railway
Steamships of the United Kingdom